Sarah Drew is an American actress and director. She played Hannah Rogers in The WB family drama series Everwood (2004–2006) and Dr. April Kepner in the ABC medical drama series Grey's Anatomy (2009–2018, 2021–2022).

Early life
Drew was born and raised in Stony Brook, New York, where she attended The Stony Brook School. Her mother, Dr. Jeannie Drew, is now teaching biology at an independent private school for girls in Manhattan. Her father, Rev. Charles Drew, is the senior pastor at Emmanuel Presbyterian Church in New York City. Her brother, Allen Drew, is a pastor at Mt. Airy Community Church in Philadelphia and director of an a cappella group at Germantown Friends School. She received a bachelor's degree in drama from the University of Virginia in 2002.

Career 
In 1997, while in high school, Drew voiced Stacy Rowe on the animated series Daria. She also voiced that character in the Daria television films Is It Fall Yet? and Is It College Yet?. In 2001, she made her professional stage debut as Juliet in Romeo and Juliet at the McCarter Theatre in Princeton, New Jersey. She made her Broadway debut in 2003 in Vincent in Brixton, which later took her to London's West End. She made the move to television with a guest role in the series Wonderfalls, and was in the film Radio. She appeared as Katie Burrell, the daughter of a Japanese relocation camp sergeant, in the 2007 film American Pastime.

From 2004 to 2006, Drew starred as Hannah Rogers in The WB drama series Everwood. She later guest-starred on Cold Case, Law & Order: Special Victims Unit, Medium, Castle, Glee, Privileged, Supernatural, and Private Practice. She starred in the Hallmark Hall of Fame film Front of the Class (2008), and from 2008 to 2009, she had a recurring role as Kitty Romano in the AMC drama series Mad Men. In 2014, she starred in the film Moms' Night Out.

Grey's Anatomy
In 2009, Drew was cast as Dr. April Kepner in the medical drama series Grey's Anatomy. Drew was cast in late September and first appeared in the sixth season episode “Invasion" as one of the residents from Mercy West Hospital after its merger with Seattle Grace Hospital. Drew was brought aboard Grey's Anatomy after former collaborations with series creator Shonda Rhimes; she was featured as a guest in 2 episodes of Private Practice in 2008 and was a main cast member in Rhimes' 2009 television pilot Inside the Box, which ABC passed on. In 2010, she was promoted to a series-regular for the seventh season.

In March 2018, it was announced that Drew, along with Jessica Capshaw, would be exiting the series. Showrunner Krista Vernoff stated that the decision was purely creative, not budgetary.

2018–present
Shortly following the announcement of her Grey's Anatomy exit, Drew was cast as Detective Cagney in CBS' Cagney & Lacey reboot pilot. CBS passed on the pilot in May 2018, deciding not to produce the series. In July 2018, Drew took on the role of Lucille Ball, starring in the world premiere production of I Love Lucy: A Funny Thing Happened on the Way to the Sitcom, a behind-the-scenes stage comedy about I Love Lucy by Gregg Oppenheimer (son of series creator Jess Oppenheimer). Recorded before a live audience at the UCLA's James Bridges Theater, the L.A. Theatre Works production aired on public radio and has been released on Audio CD and as a downloadable MP3. In 2019, Drew was once again cast as the title character in a CBS pilot, this time as Sarah Cooper in The Republic of Sarah, but the project was ultimately passed on by the network. A different leading cast, led by Stella Baker, was chosen when the series was rebooted by The CW network for the 2020–21 season.

On October 30, 2020, Drew has been cast in a recurring role as Cindy Turner (Jeanette's mother) in the Freeform (ABC Family) series Cruel Summer.

In September 2021, Drew was cast in Apple TV+ comedy series Amber Brown based on the bestselling books by Paula Danziger.

In 2022, Drew started as Lizbeth Meredith in the Lifetime movie Stolen By Their Father as part of its "Ripped from the Headlines" feature films and also had Elizabeth Smart as an executive producer.

Personal life
Drew married Peter Lanfer, a lecturer at UCLA, on the 17th of June 2002. They welcomed their first child together on January 18, 2012, a son named Micah Emmanuel. On December 3, 2014, the couple welcomed their second child and first daughter, Hannah Mali Rose. She is Christian. This matched her character’s beliefs from the movie Mom’s Night Out.

Filmography

Film

Television

Video Games

Web

References

External links

20th-century American actresses
21st-century American actresses
Actresses from New York (state)
Actresses from Virginia
American film actresses
American television actresses
American voice actresses
Living people
People from Charlottesville, Virginia
People from Long Island
People from Stony Brook, New York
The Stony Brook School alumni
University of Virginia alumni
American television directors
American women television directors
Year of birth missing (living people)